Jacob's Sound is a film directed by Anna Dudley released in 2003 starring Tyhm Kennedy and Nicole Williams.

External links
 

2003 films
2003 short films